The Bible and Critical Theory is a biannual peer-reviewed open access academic journal in the fields of biblical studies and critical theory. It was established by Roland Boer in 2004, and was published by Monash University ePress until 2010. Since 2011 it has been published independently. Julie Kelso was the editor-in-chief from 2008-2011, and then she co-edited with Boer from 2012-2015. From 2016-2020, Caroline Blyth and Robert J. Myles were editors-in-chief.

Abstracting and indexing
The journal is abstracted and indexed in the ATLA Religion Database and Scopus.

References

External links
 

Biblical studies journals
Publications established in 2004
English-language journals
Biannual journals